The American Housing Act of 1949 was a landmark, sweeping expansion of the federal role in mortgage insurance and issuance and the construction of public housing. It was part of President Harry Truman's program of domestic legislation, the Fair Deal.

Background 
During the Roosevelt administration the National Housing Act of 1934 which established the Federal Housing Administration (FHA) and the Housing Act of 1937 were signed into law, the latter of which directed the federal government to subsidize local public housing agencies. On April 12, 1945 the passing of President Franklin D. Roosevelt propelled Harry S. Truman Vice President into the seat of Presidency. Truman secured the Democratic nomination in 1948 presidential election, with a platform promising to provide for slum clearance and low-rent housing projects. Truman was elected to a full term in 1948 with the Democrats also reclaiming the House of Representatives and the Senate.

In his 1949 State of the Union address unveiling the Fair Deal, Truman reiterated his desire to pass comprehensive housing legislation. The Senate had successfully passed bills allocating federal aid for public housing in 1946 and 1948, although these efforts died in the House of Representatives on both occasions.

During the 81st Congress, Republican Sen. Robert A. Taft sponsored the legislation with Democratic backers Allen J. Ellender and Robert F. Wagner. On April 21, 1949, the Senate approved the legislation by a vote of 57-13, with all but two of the "nay" votes coming from Republicans. The House of Representatives voted 227-186 in favor of the bill on June 29, 1949. President Truman signed the bill into law on July 15, 1949.

Legislative history

Provisions

Title I - Slum Clearance & Community Development & Redevelopment

Authorized $1 Billion in loans to help cities acquire slums and blighted land for public or private redevelopment. It also allotted $100 million every year for five years for grants to cover two-thirds of the difference between the cost of the slum land and its reuse value.

Title II - Amendments to National Housing Act

Amended the National Housing Act of 1934 by reauthorizing the FHA for six weeks and raised by $500 million the amount the FHA was allowed to offer as mortgage insurance.

Title III - Low Rent Public Housing

Required that public housing authorities demolish or renovate one slum dwelling unit for every public housing apartment they built.

Title IV - Housing Research

Provided funds and the authority to conduct extensive research into the economics of housing construction, markets, and financing.

Title V - Farm Housing

Addressed the problems of rural housing by reorganizing and expanding the loan program initiated under the Bankhead-Johns Farm Tenant Act of 1937, which allowed farmer to purchase and improve farms.

Title VI - Miscellaneous Provisions

See also
 Housing Act of 1937
 Section 514 loans
 Section 516 grants
 Section 533 grants

References

Further reading
 Clement, Bell. "Wagner-Steagall and the DC Alley Dwelling Authority: A Bid for Housing-Centered Urban Redevelopment, 1934–1946." Journal of the American Planning Association 78.4 (2012): 434-448.
 Congressional Quarterly. "Housing a Nation." (1966).
 Foard, Ashley A. "Law and Contemporary Problems." 25.4 (1960).
 Heathcott, Joseph. "The Strange Career of Public Housing: Policy, Planning, and the American Metropolis in the Twentieth Century." Journal of the American Planning Association 78.4 (2012): 360-375.
 Jenkins, William D. "Before Downtown: Cleveland, Ohio, and Urban Renewal, 1949-1958." Journal of Urban History 27.4 (2001): 471-496.
 Lang, Robert E., and Rebecca R. Sohmer. "Legacy of the Housing Act of 1949: The Past, Present, and Future of Federal Housing and Urban Policy." Housing Policy Debate  (2000): 291-298. online
 Orlebeke, Charles J. "The Evolution of Low‐Income Housing Policy, 1949 to 1999." Housing policy debate 11.2 (2000): 489-520.
 Patterson, James. "Mr. Republican: A Biography of Robert A Taft." Houghton Mifflin (1972).
 Radford, Gail, "Modern Housing for America: Policy Struggles in the New Deal Era" (Chicago: University of Chicago Press, 1996).
 Vale, Lawrence J., "From the Puritans to the Projects: Public Housing and Public Neighbors" (Cambridge, Massachusetts: Harvard Press, 2000).
 Vale, Lawrence J., “Reclaiming Public Housing: A Half Century of Struggle in Three Public Neighborhoods” (Cambridge, Massachusetts: Harvard Press, 2002).
 von Hoffman, Alexander. "A Study in Contradictions: The Origins and Legacy of the Housing Act of 1949." Housing policy debate 11.2 (2000): 299-326. online
 von Hoffman, Alexander. "High Ambitions: The Past and Future of American Housing Policy". Housing Policy Debate 7.3 (1996).
 von Hoffman, Alexander. "The Lost History of Urban Renewal." Journal of Urbanism 1.3 (2008): 281-301. 

United States federal housing legislation
1949 in law
1949 in the United States
Public housing in the United States
81st United States Congress
United States federal legislation articles without infoboxes
Housing legislation in the United States